Joe Wicks may refer to:

Joe Wicks (coach) (born 1985), British fitness coach, television presenter and author
Joe Wicks (EastEnders), a character from British soap opera EastEnders
Joseph Wicks (1896–1984), US judge of the Okanogan County, Washington and Ferry County, Washington Superior Court